North Coast Rocketry was a model rocket company founded in 1983 in Cleveland, Ohio by Chris Pearson and Matt Steele. Dan Kafun added as a partner in 1989.

History
North Coast Rocketry was the first "full-service" mid-power rocket company, that is, they sold model rocket kits, parts, adhesives, parachutes and motors.  They originally licensed their rocket kit designs from Korey Kline of Ace Aeronautics.  They later developed their own line of unique High Power rockets and introduced some technologies and designs that were "cutting edge" for their time.  Later the NCR catalog also included rocket kits from the fledging company Lots of Crafts (later LOC/Precision) for several years.

To augment their product line, NCR was also a dealer for Class "C" Aerotech motors and Class "B" Vulcan motors in the mid to late 1980s.  NCR sold a limited selection of disposable motors beginning in 1984 that were called "North Coasters".  The North Coaster motors were manufactured by Aerotech under a special agreement with NCR, who had sole distribution rights.  The motors were shipped to North Coast Rocketry near with no end caps or labels, and final processing was conducted by North Coast Rocketry.

The North Coasters rocket motor line consisted of the E28 (24mm), F41 and G60 (29mm) motors.  They were phased out late in 1987 due to supply issues.  North Coast planned to make reloadable motors, and a few prototype cases were made, but the propellant shipping issues of the early 1990s stopped their development.  NCR reloadable motor design was said to be so simple, using color-coded parts, that assembly could be done by someone who knew nothing about rockets and who hadn't read one word of the instructions.  The reloadable motor technology was never actually put into production.

North Coast Rocketry also sold the "Whirlwind" composite model rocket motor, which was the first smokey composite motor available.  This motor was made exclusively for NCR by Rocket Development Corporation (RDC), which was the same company that introduced the "Enerjet 8" composite rocket motor to the model rocketry world in the late 60's.

In the late 80's, NCR became the first rocket company of any kind to have a 800 toll-free phone number for ordering.  They were also the first to take orders by phone, fax or e-mail and accept credit cards for payment. 

North Coast Rocketry became the sponsor of the early Large and Dangerous Rocket Ship (LDRS) launches held in Medina, Ohio from 1982-86. In 1987 the use of the name was given to the Tripoli Rocketry Association (TRA) to use for their annual national high-power sport launch.  The launch continues to this day, however, LDRS has never returned to Ohio. 

North Coast Rocketry was moved to Salt Lake City, Utah in 1992.  During this time, NCR branched out into making composite motors based on potassium perchlorate that would produce a pink flame during the burn.

North Coast Rocketry was subsequently purchased by Estes Industries' around 1995-1996 and served as Estes' mid/high-power model rocketry division.  The NCR motor technology was changed by Estes to the more industry-standard APCP (ammonium-perchlorate) composite propellant).  All Estes versions of the NCR models used the F62 Dark Star motors, which emitted a dark black smoke trail.  These motors were made specifically for NCR rockets and were slightly smaller in diameter than their competitor's motors.  The motor was unique in that it had a molded aft thrust ring on the motor.  A G70 motor was announced but never produced.

The "North Coast Rocketry by Estes" line of mid-power rocket kits was very popular and command high-prices on the kit collector market today.  Especially in-demand is the "Maxi X-Wing" and "Interceptor G" kits.

Estes discontinued the NCR line of rocket kits, motors and other products in 2000.  Since the brand has been discontinued, when building the kits today, many people modify the motor mounts to use industry-standard 29mm size motors.

NCR also sold a heavy duty launch pad, launch controller and relay system.  They were also the first to sell rocket electronics, manufactured by John Fleischer of Transolve.  These included the first rocket altimeter, a radio tracker, a beeper, a variable timer for staging and recovery system deployment and a strobe light.

NCR sold a series of rocketry technical reports, authored by Chris Pearson and Matt Steele, with collaboration of Scott Dixon of Vulcan Systems and John Fleischer of Transolve.  These reports were later adopted by the National Association of Rocketry as their technical report series.  The Tripoli Rocketry Association also published these same reports in their official monthly publication, the Tripolitian.

At NARAM-53 (the National Association of Rocketry's Annual Meet) in Cincinnati in July 2011, Matt Steele (one of the principals of the former North Coast Rocketry) announced that he had sufficient rights to the name and products and that he and his daughter would be bringing the company back to life with a website going live on October 1, 2011. He said the initial kits would be based on 2.6" tubing, and would not be "three fins and a nose cone".

Models

Early models
 Aires XL
 Avatar
 Avatar Arrow
 Big Brute
 Black Hole Betty
 Brighthawk
 Corporal
 D Region Tomahawk
 Eliminator
 Hobgoblin
 Juno 1
 Korona
 Lance Beta
 Magna
 Mini-Katana
 Katana
 Mini-Spoil Sport
 Spoil Sport
 Orion
 OSC Pegasus
 Outlaw (Radio Controlled Boost Glider)
 Patriot
 Phantom 1800
 Phantom 2600
 Phantom 4000
 Phantom 4000HD
 Quasar NG
 Rotaroc A
 Rotaroc B/C
 Rotaroc D
 SA-14 Archer XL
 Stiletto A
 Stiletto B
 Sonic Seduction
 Super-Sonic Seduction
 Mini-Viking
 Viking

Estes era
 Big Brute
 Bomarc
 Eliminator
 Interceptor G
 Lance Beta
 Patriot
 Phantom 4000
 SA-14 Archer XL
 Star Wars X-Wing Fighter

External links 
Company website
1986 NCR Catalog
1992 NCR Catalog

Model rocketry
Companies based in Ohio
Companies based in Colorado
Companies based in Utah
1989 establishments in Ohio